Master Kapuram is a 1990 Telugu-language drama film, produced by Vijay and Y. T. Naidu under the Sri Gayathri Kala Chitra banner and directed by P. N. Ramachandra Rao. It stars Rajendra Prasad, Gayatri  and music composed by Raj–Koti. The film is a remake of the Malayalam film Sasneham. The movie was predominantly shot in Horsley hills and surrounding towns.The film won two Nandi Awards.

Plot
The film begins with a couple, David (Rajendra Prasad) a Christian & Geetha (Gayatri) an orthodox Brahmin Hindu who wedlocks the interreligious marriage. As a result, they have been ostracized by their families. Later, Geeta gives birth to a baby boy when both families visit their house to watch the newborn baby. Right now, chaos occurs due to the different lifestyles and customs which splits the marital life of David & Geetha. The rest of the story is about how the misunderstandings are removed between them.

Cast
Rajendra Prasad as David
Gayatri as Geeta
Gollapudi Maruthi Rao as George
Kota Srinivasa Rao as Paidaiah
Suthi Velu as Simham
Raavi Kondala Rao as Godavari Sastry 
Dr. Siva Prasad as Chengal Rao
Badi Tataji as Kuppaiah
Radha Kumari as Veroni
Lakshmi Kanakala as Meenakshamma
Chandrika as Kokila
Prameela as Lucie
Jaya Vijaya as David's mother
Y. Vijaya as Rose Mary

Soundtrack

Music composed by Raj–Koti. Lyrics were written by Veturi. Music released on LEO Audio Company.

Awards
Nandi Awards - 1990
Best Male Comedian - Suthivelu 
Best Dialogue Writer - Gollapudi Maruti Rao

References

1990s Telugu-language films
Indian drama films
Telugu remakes of Malayalam films
Films scored by Raj–Koti